Owen Brown may refer to:

 Owen Brown (abolitionist, born 1771) (1771–1856), father of John Brown, the abolitionist
 Owen Brown (abolitionist, born 1824) (1824–1889), son of John Brown, the abolitionist
 Owen Brown (footballer) (born 1960), football forward
 Owen Brown, Columbia, Maryland

Brown, Owen